This Note's for You is the 16th studio album by Canadian / American musician Neil Young, released April 11, 1988 on Reprise. It was originally credited to "Young and the Bluenotes." Part of the album's concept centered on the commercialism of rock and roll, and tours in particular (the title track, specifically, is a hostile social commentary on concert sponsorship). The music is marked by the use of a horn section. It also marked Young's return to the recently reactivated Reprise Records after a rocky tenure with Geffen Records.

In 2015, Young released a live album from the album's accompanying tour, which he titled Bluenote Café.

Background and recording
During the 1987 tour with Crazy Horse, Young began playing a short "blues" set between the standard acoustic and electric sets, featuring Crazy Horse (with Poncho Sampedro playing organ instead of guitar), Ben Keith, and Young's guitar tech Larry Cragg on saxophones. The song "This Note's for You" was debuted at those shows. Young liked the results ("...[crowd] were going fucking nuts and no one was shouting for "Southern Man" like they've done throughout my whole fucking career"), and following the tour conclusion he further expanded the horn section, dubbing the new band The Bluenotes.

The band made its live debut in November 1987 with a 10-date California club tour, playing mostly new material, influenced by classic R&B and big band sound, mixed with several old numbers dating back to Young's earliest band, The Squires (such as "Ain't It the Truth"). The Bluenotes then entered the studio to start recording, however Young became dissatisfied with the performances of the Crazy Horse rhythm section; bassist Billy Talbot was fired first, temporarily replaced by George Whitsell before Rick Rosas was finally brought in, while drummer Ralph Molina was replaced by Rosas's bandmate Chad Cromwell. Most of the songs were then either overdubbed or redone from scratch with Rosas and Cromwell; only "One Thing" and rarity "Ain't It the Truth" still feature Whitsell and Molina's playing. 

This Note's for You was originally attributed to Neil Young and the Bluenotes (as can be seen on the early editions of the album), however, after musician Harold Melvin took legal action against Young over use of the Bluenotes name, it became credited as a Young solo album. Thus, the band was renamed Ten Men Working.

"This Note's for You" video
The video for the title track – directed by Julien Temple and written by Charlie Coffey – included a Michael Jackson lookalike whose hair catches fire. The video parodied corporate rock and the pretensions of advertising, and was patterned after a series of Michelob ads that featured contemporary rock artists such as Eric Clapton, Genesis and Steve Winwood. The video also featured parodic inserts from commercials featuring impersonators of Jackson and Whitney Houston, as well as popular characters such as a Spuds McKenzie lookalike. The title itself mocks Budweiser's "This Bud's for You" ad campaign.

It was initially banned by MTV after legal threats from Michael Jackson's attorneys, although Canadian music channel MuchMusic ran it immediately. After it was a hit on MuchMusic, MTV reconsidered their decision and put it into heavy rotation, finally giving it the MTV Video Music Award for Best Video of the Year for 1989. It was nominated for a Grammy in the category of "Best Concept Video" of 1989 but lost to "Weird Al" Yankovic's spoof of Michael Jackson's "Bad", "Fat".

When NME challenged David Lee Roth about his own corporate sponsorship (by Toshiba), citing "This Note's for You", the singer responded: "That's just hippy bullshit from the '60s. If your message is not strong enough to transcend a soda-pop commercial, you got problems!"

Artwork
The cover of this album is reportedly a photo taken in the back lane of the 200 block of Main Street Winnipeg, which housed the Blue Note Cafe. Neil was known to play unannounced in the Blue Note Cafe while in Winnipeg.

Other recordings with the Bluenotes
Young toured with the Bluenotes band (later renamed to Ten Men Workin' for the legal reasons noted above) throughout 1988, playing predominantly new material, including a number of unreleased songs. A live album from the tour, titled Bluenote Café, was planned at the time as a follow-up to the studio album but got shelved, although two songs appeared on compilation Lucky Thirteen in 1993; it was eventually released in 2015 as volume 11 of Young's Archive Performance Series.

Young also did more studio sessions with the band in 1988; three known songs that were recorded are "Crime in the City (Sixty to Zero Part I)", "Someday" (both songs would be included on next year's Freedom) and "Ordinary People", an 18-minute song described as "'Cortez the Killer' with horns", which finally saw its release on Young's 2007 studio album, Chrome Dreams II. The horn section from the Bluenotes also plays on the Stephen Stills song "That Girl" from the Crosby, Stills, Nash & Young album American Dream (1988).

Track listing

B-sides

Personnel
Neil Young – vocals, guitar

The Bluenotes
Chad Cromwell – drums
Rick "The Bass Player" Rosas – bass
Frank "Poncho" Sampedro – keyboards
Steve Lawrence – lead tenor saxophone
Ben Keith – alto saxophone
Larry Cragg – baritone saxophone
Claude Cailliet – trombone
John Fumo – trumpet on "Can't Believe Your Lyin'"
Tom Bray – trumpet on "Coupe de Ville"
with:
George Whitsell – bass on "One Thing"
Ralph Molina – drums on "One Thing"
Steve Onuska – tambourine on "One Thing"

Charts

References

External links

1988 albums
Neil Young albums
Reprise Records albums
Albums produced by Neil Young
Albums produced by Niko Bolas